American Gangster is the tenth studio album by American rapper Jay-Z. It was conceived as a concept album—inspired by the 2007 film of the same name—and was released on November 6 of that year through Roc-A-Fella Records. The album features production from Diddy & the Hitmen, Just Blaze, and the Neptunes, among others. It also includes guest appearances by Beanie Sigel, Lil Wayne, Pharrell, and Nas. The album's production is built around 1970s soul and funk, with instruments featured on the album played by professional musicians including, horns, string arrangements, drummers, and unconventional percussion created with bottles. The album's theme is based around the gangster lifestyle, the American Dream, and Jay-Z's memories of growing up in Brooklyn, New York's Marcy.

American Gangster received widespread critical acclaim and was viewed by music critics as a return to Jay-Z's best form following the critical disappointment of Kingdom Come (2006). It was ranked among the best albums of 2007 in several publications' year-end lists, including The Austin Chronicle, who ranked it number one. Rolling Stone also named the album's second single, "Roc Boys (And the Winner Is...)", the best song of 2007.

The album was also a commercial success, debuting at number one on the US Billboard 200, selling over 425,000 copies in its first week. This became Jay-Z's tenth number-one album, tying him with Elvis Presley for the second most number-one albums on the chart. A month after its release, it was certified platinum by the Recording Industry Association of America (RIAA) in December 2007. This would be Jay-Z's last album released under Def Jam Recordings before signing with Live Nation two years later.

Recording and production 
American Gangster was recorded in sessions at Audiovision Studio and South Beach Studios in Miami; SoundTrap Studios in Atlanta; Hot Beats Recording Studios in Atlanta; and Baseline Studios, Daddy's House, KMA Studios, and Rock The Mic in New York. Jay-Z would have the film American Gangster playing on the monitors above the recording booth as a source of motivation during the recording sessions. In an interview with MTV, producer LV from the Hitmen said "Jay would have the beats...He'd do the record, and he'd send it back to us. We'd fill in the blanks as far as making them full records. From having live horns, live strings, live drummers. This percussion dude, he was coming in with bottles, banging on bottles, just sprinkles of shit. We went all out. We brought in musicians to bring it out. Jay probably just heard a sample and some drums. Once we got the vocals back, we brought in all the extra candy".

The Neptunes provided production twice on the album, with the first single "Blue Magic", which is the fourteenth track, and the eighth track "I Know". Diddy and two of his producers known as LV & Sean C, who are from his production team, the Hitmen, are responsible for six tracks on the album. They are credited with the second single, "Roc Boys (And the Winner Is)...", "American Dreamin'" (where his other production partner Mario Winans assists), "No Hook", "Party Life", "Pray", and "Sweet". DJ Toomp delivers one track for the album, while Just Blaze is credited for a bonus track and the re-make of "Ignorant Shit". Kanye West mentor No I.D. gives two tracks also, one which he co-produces with Jermaine Dupri and vice versa. Finally, three lesser known producers lend hand to the "Intro", which is credited to Chris Flames and co-production from Idris "Driis" Elba, while Bigg D produces the Beastie Boys–sampling Lil Wayne assisted track "Hello Brooklyn 2.0".

Jay-Z originally stated he recorded nine tracks for the album, but the final track listing accumulated fifteen overall cuts (including 2 bonus tracks). Def Jam executive Tracey Waples noted each track from the album would have its own "mini-film". The album cover and music videos were costume designed by June Ambrose.

Music and lyrics 
According to Yahoo! Music journalist Angus Batey, American Gangster used "a selection of beats built from '70s soul and funk" to reflects "the period setting; lyrically, its primary theme is an investigation of the evolution of the gangsta archetype, looking at how the drug dealer became a semi-sympathetic outlaw figure, examining the contradictions inherent in those who chase the American Dream on the far side of legality, and ruminating on what this period of US history might yet come to mean". Jay-Z stated that almost every song is based on a specific scene from the film. In an interview on the Charlie Rose Show, he elucidated the inspiration behind the album:

Although Jay-Z says American Gangster was inspired by the movie, songs such as "Say Hello" touch on the topics of censorship and the Jena 6 controversy. Jay-Z also drew on personal memories he had not touched on in a while, specifically memories from his early life when he lived in Brooklyn, New York City, New York's Marcy.

Release and promotion 
American Gangster was made available for digital download in its entirety, at Amazon.com, Roc-A-Fella's website, and Rhapsody on November 6, 2007. Jay-Z had the album removed from the iTunes Store, explaining that "as movies are not sold scene by scene, this collection will not be sold as individual singles." It was eventually released to iTunes in 2011.

Jay-Z promoted the album with the American Gangster Live concert tour, performing material only from the album in five smaller sized venues across the US, starting on November 6 in Los Angeles and ending on November 12 in Philadelphia. According to a statement from Roc-A-Fella.com, the five-city club tour sold out in less than 60 seconds.

Critical reception 

American Gangster was met with widespread critical acclaim. At Metacritic, which assigns a normalized rating out of 100 to reviews from mainstream publications, the album received an average score of 83, based on 25 reviews.

Reviewing the album for Rolling Stone, Rob Sheffield deemed it a vast improvement over Jay-Z's previous record, Kingdom Come, adding that the rapper "sounds relaxed, no longer worried about impressing anyone." In Entertainment Weekly, Neil Drumming said it was more than "a throwback album" and that Jay-Z adjusts his flow to each production while "emerging cockier than ever on the next track". Village Voice critic Amy Linden praised its live instrumentation, finding it lush, sexy, and "tailor-made for the '70s theme ... without being shamelessly retro". According to The Observers Steve Yates, "it's Jay-Z's and American Gangsters triumph that reflecting on his appetite seems to have reawakened it". Nathan Rabin from The A.V. Club called the record a "surprisingly strong return to form", while Hot Press journalist Chris Wasser found its songs smooth and clever, "intelligent numbers that, instead of bombarding us with stale rhyming schemes and plastic beats, groove ever so effectively." Greg Kot was impressed by the complexity of Jay-Z's metaphors about drug trafficking, making music, and relationships; he wrote in the Chicago Tribune that the rapper offers the kind of multidimensional lyrics that characterize classic hip hop.

Some reviewers expressed reservations. Kelefa Sanneh wrote in The New York Times that Jay-Z's reluctance to indulge in the gangsta rap lyricism of his past resulted in wavering, equivocal songs such as "No Hook" and "Say Hello". "Once, words just seemed to flow out of him, as if he couldn't help himself", Sanneh said. "Now it's clearer than ever that he's choosing them carefully." Louis Pattison of NME was more critical and called it a regression from the "slightly bloated" Kingdom Come, lamenting the shortage of "don't-give-a-fuck attitude" highlighted on "Success" in favor of less effective raps exploiting Jay-Z's entrepreneurial personage. In MSN Music, Robert Christgau cited "Say Hello" and "Blue Magic" as highlights while humorously using sampled film dialogue from the latter track to frame his lukewarm opinion of the album: "Jay-Z, that's a brand name, like Pepsi, that's a brand name – he stands behind it, he guarantees it, even if you don't know him any more than you know the chairman of Universal Music". He later assigned it a one-star honorable mention.

American Gangster was ranked in the top ten of several music publications' end-of-year lists, including The Austin Chronicle (number one), Spin (number eight), and Rolling Stone magazine (number three). Rolling Stone also named the album's second single, "Roc Boys (And the Winner Is...)", the best single of 2007. In The Village Voices annual Pazz & Jop critics poll, American Gangster finished 18th in the best albums voting. In an interview with Jeff Johnson of cable network BET, 44th United States President Barack Obama said he was a fan of the album.

Commercial performance
American Gangster debuted at number one in the US Billboard 200 chart, selling 425,000 copies in its first week, according to Nielsen Soundscan. This became Jay-Z's tenth US number one album, tying him with Elvis Presley at second most number-one albums in the US with the record is being held by The Beatles. In its second week, the album dropped to number eight on the chart, selling an additional 131,000 copies. On December 6, 2007, the album was certified platinum by the Recording Industry Association of America (RIAA) for shipments of over one million copies. As of August 2009, the album has sold 1,131,000 copies in the United States.

Track listing 

Notes
 signifies a co-producer

Samples and Additional Vocals
"I Know" and "Blue Magic" features additional vocals by Pharrell Williams.
"Roc Boys (And the Winner Is...)" features additional vocals by Beyoncé, Kanye West and Cassie. "Roc Boys (And the Winner Is...)" samples "Make the Road by Walking" by The Menahan Street Band.

Personnel

Charts

Weekly charts

Year-end charts

Certifications

See also
List of number-one albums of 2007 (U.S.)
List of number-one R&B albums of 2007 (U.S.)

References

External links 
 

2007 albums
Albums produced by Jermaine Dupri
Albums produced by Just Blaze
Albums produced by DJ Toomp
Albums produced by the Neptunes
Albums produced by No I.D.
Albums produced by Sean Combs
Concept albums
Def Jam Recordings albums
Jay-Z albums
Roc-A-Fella Records albums
Mafioso rap albums
Albums produced by Jay-Z